Fred Maas (born 1957) is the Founder and CEO of Pacific EcoCompanies LLC, which specializes in investments in and development of sustainable buildings, communities and clean technologies. Also a San Diego resident, Maas works in the San Diego political, business and non-profit communities. Fred Maas graduated from Hobart College in 1979 where he majored in Political Science. Later, he graduated cum laude from Syracuse University College of Law in 1982. For over 30 years, Fred Maas has participated in national, state and local politics, and worked for prominent political figures such as, John McCain, Bob Dole, Jack Kemp, Pete du Pont, Richard Lugar and Mitch Daniels.

Environmental stewardship 
From 2003 to 2009, Fred Maas served as President and CEO of Black Mountain Ranch LLC, Del Sur  and Pacific Golf Communities LLC. His involvement in Black Mountain Ranch and The Ranch House at Del Sur, one of the highest rated Platinum LEED  buildings in the nation, led both properties to be recognized as some of the most sustainable communities and facilities in the United States.

His environmental work has been honored with Governor Arnold Schwarzenegger's Environmental and Economic Leadership Award in 2007, the National Association of Home Builder's Green Development of the Year Award in 2008, Urban Land Institute's (San Diego/Tijuana Chapter) Smart Growth Champion Award in 2008, the San Diego Excellence in Energy (SANDEE) award from the California Center for Sustainable Energy in 2007, San Diego Gas & Electric's Sustainable Communities Champion Award in 2007  and the California Integrated Waste Management Board's Waste Reduction Award.

Civic activities in San Diego 
Maas also served as the interim CEO until 2010. In addition, he currently serves on the Joint Powers Authority for North Embarcadero Visionary Plan, was the member of the City of San Diego's Task Force for the Location of a Permanent Homeless Shelter and the Mayor's task force for the Expansion of the San Diego Convention Center, and chaired the Candidate Selection Committee for the Redevelopment of the San Diego Civic Center and City Hall.

Additionally, Maas sits on two non-profit boards: CleanTech San Diego, which promotes and fosters the development of sustainable businesses and practices in San Diego and Tijuana, and MOVE SAN DIEGO, which promotes transit alternatives in the region (formerly the San Diego Coalition for Transportation Choices, formed with the San Diego Chapter of the Sierra Club).

Other civic activities 
Admitted to the District of Columbia Bar in 1983, Maas served on the Litigation Advisory Board of the Washington Legal Foundation and the Board of Zoning Appeals for the Village of Roslyn, New York. In addition, Maas served on the Board of Advisors of the Center for Public Policy for B'nai B'rith International.

Developer for the PGA TOUR, Inc. 
For 10 years, Maas worked as a principal in the firm Potomac Sports Properties, Inc., which developed residential and resort communities involving the PGA TOUR, Inc., including the Tournament Players Club ("TPC") at Avenel, TPC at Cheval, TPC at Virginia Beach and the Four Seasons Hualalai.

During the 1980s, Fred Maas also led the real estate consulting practice for the National Strategies and Marketing Group (NS&MG), a firm that specialized in public affairs, grassroots lobbying, strategic planning, community relations and crisis management. NS&MG represented the PGA TOUR, Inc. on federal regulatory, legislative and tax matters and oversaw marketing efforts for the TPC at Avenel.

Political activities 
Fred Maas has worked in Republican politics for over 30 years and continues to serve as a consultant and advisor to numerous campaigns in federal, state and local offices.

In 1983, Maas worked in the Office of the General Counsel and Research Director at the National Republican Senatorial Committee. Maas served as Assistant Counsel to the Minority Leader of the New York State Assembly as well as Campaign Manager during the race for the U.S. Senate in Delaware in 1984. In 1988, Maas was New Hampshire Campaign Director for Governor Pete du Pont's presidential campaign

In 2008, Maas was a member of the National Finance Committee of Senator John McCain's presidential bid. In addition, Maas was a Senior Advisor for Bob Dole's 1996 presidential campaign and was Deputy Campaign Director for Vice-Presidential Candidate, Jack Kemp.

2012 San Diego mayor race  
Prior to the 2012 San Diego mayoral election, Maas and others spent more than $33,000 in an opposition research effort regarding then-candidate Carl DeMaio, a potential violation of campaign laws. The research was widely distributed to reporters, but went largely ignored, with the exception of the LGBT Weekly of San Diego.

These allegations were reviewed by both state and local election authorities who dismissed these claims with no finding of any wrongdoing, violations  or political activity. DeMaio was soundly defeated.

San Diego Chargers special advisor 
On February 8, 2016, Maas was hired by the NFL's San Diego Chargers to be the special advisor to Dean Spanos. He advised Spanos and the Chargers on the Citizen's Initiative process, explored possible stadium financing plans, drafted an initiative document, and created the campaign infrastructure. Maas also worked closely with an established team of legal, financial, and land use advisors.

Personal achievements
2009 - Named Public Official of the Year by BOMA San Diego[16]
2008 - Received Chairman's Award from the Downtown San Diego Partnership[17]
2008 - Received the President's Award from the San Diego Building Industry Association
2008 - Named Smart Growth Champion of the Year by Urban Land Institute San Diego/Tijuana[5][6]
2007 - Named one of 120 Top Influentials by the San Diego Daily Transcript[18]
2007 - San Diego City Council named September 27, 2007 "Fredric J. Maas" Day
2006 - Named one of 50 People to Watch by San Diego Magazine[19]
2006 - Named one of 20 Movers and Shakers by San Diego Metropolitan Magazine

Project achievements 
 2008 - Black Mountain Ranch received a Green Development of the Year Award from National Association of Home Builders
 2007 - Del Sur Property was named the winner of Governor Arnold Schwarzenegger's Environmental and Economic Leadership award in San Diego, California 
 2007 - Ranch House at Del Sur received San Diego's first Platinum rating for Leadership in Energy and Environmental Design (LEED) from the U.S. Green Building Council
 2007 - Black Mountain Ranch LLC was awarded Special Achievement by a Small Business award by the California Center for Sustainable Energy
 2007 - San Diego Gas & Electric's Sustainable Communities Champion Award
 2007 - Black Mountain Ranch received California Integrated Waste Management Board's Waste Reduction Award

References

External links 
 - A sustainable Community
CleanTech San Diego
Del Sur Living
Black Mountain Ranch LLC
9th International Conference & Exhibition Healthy Buildings 2009

Businesspeople from San Diego
1957 births
Living people
Syracuse University College of Law alumni